The Cabinet of Niue is the chief executive body of Niue.

Robert Rex 
(19 October 1974 – 12 December 1992)
 Hon. Dr. Enetama Lipitoa
 Hon. Frank Fakaotimanava Lui
 Hon. Young Vivian
 Hon. Robert Rex

Young Vivian 
(1st time) (12 December 1992 – 9 March 1993)
 Hon1
 Hon2
 Hon3

Frank Lui  
(9 March 1993 – 26 March 1999)
Hon. Terry Coe
Hon. O'love Tauveve Jacobsen
Hon. Fisa Igilisi Pihigia

Sani Lakatani 
(26 March 1999 – 1 May 2002)
 Sani Lakatani (Finance, Economic Development, Offshore Banking, Tourism, Civil Aviation, Post and Telecommunications, and External Affairs)
Hon. Young Vivian (Education, Community Affairs, Art, Culture, Women's Affairs, Youth Affairs, Environment)
Hon. Dion Paki Taufitu (Administrative Services, Public Works, Agriculture, Fisheries, Forestry, Employment, Broadcasting)
Hon. Robert Matua Rex, Jr (Health, Public Service Commission, Justice, Lands and Survey, Shipping and Trade, Police and Immigration)

Associate Ministers:
 Toke Talagi (Economic Development and Civil Aviation)
 Hima Douglas

Young Vivian 
(2nd time) (1 May 2002 – June 2005)
 Hon Sani Lakatani: Deputy Prime Minister (later replaced by Fisa Igilisi Pihigia)
Hon. Bill Vakaafi Motufoou: Works, Agriculture and Fisheries
Hon. Toke Talagi: Finance, Education, Health

Young Vivian 
(3rd time) (1 May 2005 – June 2008)
Hon. Fisa Igilisi Pihigia
Hon. Bill Vakaafi Motufoou
Hon. Va'aiga Tukuitonga

Toke Talagi 
(June 2008 – May 2011)

Toke Talagi 
(May 2011 – April 2014)

Toke Talagi 
(April 2014 - May 2017)

Toke Talagi 
(May 2017 - June 2020)

Dalton Tagelagi 
(June 2020 - )

References

Niue
Politics of Niue
Political organisations based in Niue
1974 establishments in Niue